The Manipur cricket team is a cricket team that represents the state of Manipur in Indian domestic competitions. In July 2018, the Board of Control for Cricket in India (BCCI) named the team as one of the nine new sides that would compete in domestic tournaments for the 2018–19 season, including the Ranji Trophy and the Vijay Hazare Trophy. Ahead of the 2018–19 season, Shiv Sunder Das was appointed as the team's coach.

In September 2018, they lost their opening fixture of the 2018–19 Vijay Hazare Trophy, to Puducherry, by 8 wickets. The following day, they won their first fixture of the tournament, beating Sikkim by 10 wickets. In their first season in the Vijay Hazare Trophy, they finished in sixth place in the Plate Group, with two wins and five defeats from their eight matches. One match also finished as a no result. Yashpal Singh finished as the leading run-scorer, with 488 runs, and Bishworjit Singh was the leading wicket-taker for the team, with nine dismissals.

In November 2018, in their opening match of the 2018–19 Ranji Trophy, they lost to Sikkim by an innings and 27 runs. They won their first match of the 2018–19 Ranji Trophy in round three of the competition, beating Mizoram by eight wickets. They finished the 2018–19 tournament sixth in the table, with three wins from their eight matches.

In March 2019, Manipur finished sixth in Group A of the 2018–19 Syed Mushtaq Ali Trophy, with one win from their six matches. Mayank Raghav was the leading run-scorer for the team in the tournament, with 301 runs, and Yashpal Singh was the leading wicket-taker, with four dismissals. In January 2020, in the round six fixture of the 2019–20 Ranji Trophy against Meghalaya, Manipur were bowled out for only 27 runs in their first innings. On 12 February 2020, their fixture against Chandigarh was the 60,000th first-class cricket match to be played.

Squad

Updated as on 25 January 2023

References

Indian first-class cricket teams
Cricket in Manipur
2018 establishments in Manipur
Cricket clubs established in 2018